Droga krajowa nr 7 (DK 7) is a route of the Polish national roads network running from Żukowo near Gdańsk, through Warsaw and Kraków to the border with Slovakia at Chyżne. It is part of European route E77. The stretch between Kraków and Zakopane is commonly referred to as Zakopianka.

Since the beginning of 1990s parts of the DK 7 were being rebuilt to expressway standards and now form part of the Expressway S7. The section around Kraków is concurrent with Autostrada A4 motorway.

Prior to its modernisation, the DK 7 was the most dangerous road in Poland along with DK 1. In 2007 there were 765 road accidents on DK 7, with 170 people dead and 1157 injured. The following year the accident count dropped to 696.

Parts of the road are concurrent with pre-war German Reichsstraße 128 and 130.

References 

07